Thomas Taylor (1777/78–1826) was an artist and architect. He first worked in the London office of James Wyatt, and later moved to Leeds, West Yorkshire, where he established an architectural practice. His major works consisted of the design of churches in the locality of his office, in Yorkshire and Lancashire. Taylor was a pioneer in the use of the Gothic Revival style in the design of churches, and received seven commissions for the design of Commissioners' churches.

Key

Works

See also
List of Commissioners' churches in Yorkshire

References

Bibliography

Taylor, Thomas